Yohanan Bader, Jan Bader (19 August 1901 – 16 June 1994) was a Revisionist Zionist leader and Israeli politician.

Biography
Yochanan Bader was born as Jan Bader in Kraków in Austria-Hungary (today Poland), where he studied at a State Gymnasium. In his youth he was active in the Jewish Socialist Party, the "Bund" followed by "HaShomer Hatzair" but in 1925 he joined the Revisionist Zionist Movement. He studied law, economics, philosophy and history at Jagiellonian University, where he earned his Doctor of Law degree and was certified as a lawyer. He also edited the Polish language weekly Trybuna Narodowa.

He was one of the leaders of Nowa Organizacja Syjonistyczna (New Zionist Organization). Other leaders were Yosef Shofman and Ya'acov Cohen.

In September 1939, Bader moved to East Poland, then under Soviet rule; he was arrested and sentenced to hard labor in northern Russia in 1940. In 1941, he was released under the terms of the Soviet-Polish Agreement and left the Soviet Union; in August 1942 he joined the Free Polish Army. In December 1943, he immigrated to Palestine and joined the Irgun. In 1945, he was arrested by the British authorities and imprisoned in the Latrun Camp until May 1948.

Political career
Bader was one of the founders and ideologists of the Herut Movement in 1948 and editor of the newspaper Herut.

He was member of the Knesset for Herut and its successors, Gahal and Likud, from 1949 to 1977, a regular member of the Finance Committee, and was the economic spokesman of his movement; he is remembered for his rhetoric debates with former Minister of Finance Levi Eshkol. He was also chairman of the Committee on State Control. He is famous for the amendment to the election law, which became valid since the elections to the Eighth Knesset, according to which the excess votes are distributed to the lists with the largest number of voters per seat - a method known in the world as the D'Hondt method, and is known in Israel as the Bader-Ofer method - named after Bader (Gahal) and co-proposer Avraham Ofer (Alignment).

Bader retired before the 1977 elections (which Likud won). He died in 1994 in Ramat Gan.

Published works
The Knesset and Me (1979)

See also
Newspapers of Israel

References

External links
 

1901 births
1994 deaths
Politicians from Kraków
Austro-Hungarian Jews
Jews from Galicia (Eastern Europe)
Jagiellonian University alumni
Polish emigrants to Mandatory Palestine
Jews in Mandatory Palestine
Bundists
Hashomer Hatzair members
Irgun members
Herut politicians
Gahal politicians
Members of the 1st Knesset (1949–1951)
Members of the 2nd Knesset (1951–1955)
Members of the 3rd Knesset (1955–1959)
Members of the 4th Knesset (1959–1961)
Members of the 5th Knesset (1961–1965)
Members of the 6th Knesset (1965–1969)
Members of the 7th Knesset (1969–1974)
Members of the 8th Knesset (1974–1977)
Israeli lawyers
Lawyers from Kraków
Israeli journalists
Polish military personnel of World War II
Burials at Nahalat Yitzhak Cemetery
20th-century Israeli lawyers
20th-century Polish journalists